Yevgeni Stanislavovich Markov (born 7 July 1994) is a Russian football player who plays as a striker for Fakel Voronezh.

Career
He made his professional debut in the Russian Professional Football League for FC Zenit-2 Saint Petersburg on 15 July 2013 in a game against FC Tosno.

He made his debut in the Russian Football National League for FC Yenisey Krasnoyarsk on 7 September 2014 in a game against FC Volga Nizhny Novgorod.

On 18 January 2018, Markov signed a contract with FC Dynamo Moscow.

On 5 July 2019, he joined FC Rubin Kazan on loan for the 2019–20 season.

On 6 October 2020, he signed a two-year contract with FC Krasnodar. On 31 May 2021, his contract with Krasnodar was terminated early by mutual consent.

On 9 June 2021, he signed a 2-year contract with Arsenal Tula.

On 22 November 2022, Markov joined Fakel Voronezh.

Honours

Club
Tosno
 Russian Cup: 2017–18

Career statistics

Club

References

External links
 Profile by Russian Football National League
 
 

1994 births
Footballers from Saint Petersburg
Living people
Russian footballers
Russia youth international footballers
Russia under-21 international footballers
Association football forwards
FC Zenit Saint Petersburg players
FC Zenit-2 Saint Petersburg players
FC Yenisey Krasnoyarsk players
FC Tosno players
FC Dynamo Moscow players
FC Rubin Kazan players
FC Krasnodar-2 players
FC Krasnodar players
FC Arsenal Tula players
FC Fakel Voronezh players
Russian Premier League players
Russian First League players
Russian Second League players